Pangasius larnaudii, the black ear catfish is a species of freshwater shark catfish endemic to Mekong and  Chao Phraya basins.

References

Pangasiidae
Catfish of Asia
Freshwater fish of India
Fish of Thailand
Fish described in 1866